The Star was a pub at 38 St John's Wood Terrace in St John's Wood, in the City of Westminster, London, for approximately 200 years before closing in 2015. The Westminster City Council listed it as an asset of community value.  In 2017 it reopened as a gastropub.

History
The building was used as a pub since the 1820s. In 1971, Egon Ronay in one of his guidebooks, commented on its barbecues on Friday and Saturday nights during the cricket season, and the Star's popularity with both players and fans, as well as its "formidable collection of drinking vessels on show".

Notable customers have included Paul McCartney, Dustin Hoffman and Liam Gallagher. The video for The Housemartins' 1986 pop song hit Happy Hour was filmed there, and the Star appeared in the music video for Arctic Monkeys' single Teddy Picker.

Redevelopment
The Star had been owned by the pub company Punch Taverns, until it was sold to the London-based property developer West End Investments for £2.1 million in July 2013.  Its closure left only three pubs remaining in the St John's Wood High Street area.

The Star was a pub for 200 years before closing in March 2015, and becoming a branch of the estate agent chain, Champions, in April 2015.

The property developer Marcus Cooper, through his company West End Investments, had sought permission to convert it into a "single family dwelling". Westminster Council had listed the premises as an asset of community value (ACV) to prevent conversion into flats, however this ACV designation did not stop the premises being used as a bogus estate agents office. Tom Stainer, head of communications for the Campaign for Real Ale (CAMRA) commented: "This is just the latest in a long line of pubs converted due to a loophole in planning law." The council received a petition from 800 people, with support from Paul Heaton of pop group The Housemartins who filmed the video for Happy Hour in The Star in 1986.

The pub reopened as a Drunch gastropub in May 2017. This was seen as a significant win for the community to retain the premises as a community asset.

This opening followed a similar case in St John's Wood with The Clifton pub and The Star reopening within two weeks of each other. The Clifton retains its original name. The Clifton was closed for over two years, as was The Star, and was also a victim of property speculators until ACVs were imposed.

References

External links
 

Pubs in the City of Westminster
St John's Wood
Former pubs in London